Darienheros calobrensis, is a species of cichlid found in Middle America. It is distributed in the Darién area of eastern Panamá on the Pacific slope in the Tuíra, Chucunaque and Bayano River basins. This species is the only known member of its genus. The specific name alludes to the Rio Calobre, the type locality.

References

Heroini
Monotypic fish genera
Fish described in 1913